The First Menzies ministry (United Australia) was the 25th ministry of the Government of Australia. It was led by the country's 12th Prime Minister, Robert Menzies. The First Menzies ministry succeeded the Page ministry, which dissolved on 26 April 1939 following the election of Menzies as UAP leader after the death of former Prime Minister Joseph Lyons. However, due to the Country Party withdrawing from the Coalition after relations between caretaker Prime Minister Sir Earle Page and Menzies broke down, the First Menzies ministry was composed solely of UAP ministers, and was effectively a minority government. The ministry was replaced by the Second Menzies ministry on 14 March 1940 after Menzies took the Country Party back into his government - now led by Archie Cameron.

Percy Spender, who died in 1985, was the last surviving member of the First Menzies ministry; Spender was also the last surviving minister of the Second Menzies ministry, Third Menzies ministry, Fadden ministry, and the Fourth Menzies ministry.

Ministry

Notes

Ministries of George VI
Menzies, 01
1939 establishments in Australia
1940 disestablishments in Australia
Robert Menzies
Cabinets established in 1939
Cabinets disestablished in 1940